Marcus Dahlin (born 16 March 1982) is a retired Swedish football defender.

References

1982 births
Living people
Swedish footballers
Örgryte IS players
FC Trollhättan players
Association football defenders
Allsvenskan players
Superettan players